Tino Scotti (16 November 1905 – 16 October 1984) was an Italian film actor. He appeared in 65 films between 1940 and 1984. He was born in Milan, Italy, and died in Tarquinia, Italy.

Partial filmography

 Fanfulla da Lodi (1940)
 La donna perduta (1940) - Asdrubale, il cameriere
 The Pirate's Dream (1940) - Il barbiere
 Non me lo dire! (1940) - Il matto
 Caravaggio (1941)
 Labbra serrate (1942) - Francesco Ugoletti
 Stasera niente di nuovo (1942) - Il comico del varietà
 Il fanciullo del West (1942) - Penna bianca
 Pazzo d'amore (1942) - Fegato
 La valle del diavolo (1943) - Olaf, il marinaio attendente
 In due si soffre meglio (1943) - Il maggiordomo
 Lively Teresa (1943) - Albertaccio
 Anything for a Song (1943) - Il maestro di musica
 The Last Wagon (1943) - Valentino Doriani, il comico
 Chi l'ha visto? (1945)
 Departure at Seven (1946) - Filippo
 Pian delle stelle (1946)
 Before Him All Rome Trembled (1946) - Mechanic
 Voglio bene soltanto a te (1946) - Pasqualino
 Biraghin (1946)
 Ritrovarsi (1947)
 Caterina da Siena (1947)
 Sono io l'assassino (1948)
 A Dog's Life (1950) - (uncredited)
 The Knight Has Arrived! (1950) - Il Cavaliere
 Milano miliardaria (1951) - Il cavaliere Luigi Pizzigoni
 The Reluctant Magician (1951) - Cavaliere
 The Passaguai Family (1951) - Commendator Billetti
 Solo per te Lucia (1952)
 I morti non pagano tasse (1952) - Marco Vecchietti / Giovanni Rossi
 Il tallone di Achille (1952) - Cav. Achille Rosso
 Fermi tutti... arrivo io! (1953) - Andreanovic / Zanzara
 Viva la rivista! (1953)
 Siamo tutti Milanesi (1953)
 If You Won a Hundred Million (1953) - Ambrogio (segment "Il tifoso")
  Laugh! Laugh! Laugh! (1954) - comm. Rossi
 I pinguini ci guardano (1956)
 Valeria ragazza poco seria (1958) - Clemente
 Via col para... vento (1958)
 Destinazione Sanremo (1959) - Capostazione
 Guardatele ma non toccatele (1959) - Portiere d'albergo
 Gastone (1960) - The conjurer
 The Sheriff (1960) - The Judge
 ...And Suddenly It's Murder! (1960) - Fiorenzo
 Le ambiziose (1961) - Il commendator Bartolazzi
 Bellezze sulla spiaggia (1961)
 Twist, lolite e vitelloni (1962) - Barone Lanciarossa
 L'assassino si chiama Pompeo (1962) - The Psychoanalyst
 Il medico delle donne (1962)
 Un marito in condominio (1963) - Commendator Martino Martini
 Canzoni in... bikini (1963) - Ulderico & Simone Berardelli
 Marinai in coperta (1967) - Comm. Pellegatti
 Isabella, duchessa dei diavoli (1969) - Melicour
 The Howl (1970) - Intellectual at school
 The Spider's Stratagem (1970) - Costa
 Sesso in testa (1974) - Totuccio Angeletti
 City Under Siege (1974) - Il cavalier Battista
 Paolo il freddo (1974) - Commendator Galbusera
 Todo modo (1976) - Il cuoco
 Care amiche mie (1981)

References

External links

1905 births
1984 deaths
Italian male film actors
Male actors from Milan
20th-century Italian male actors